Henry Roelif Brinkerhoff (September 23, 1787 – April 30, 1844) was a U.S. Representative from Ohio, cousin of Jacob Brinkerhoff.  Born in Adams County, Pennsylvania, Brinkerhoff moved with his parents to Cayuga County, New York, in 1793.
He attended the country schools.
Commanded a company of militia in the War of 1812, distinguishing himself in the Battle of Queenstown Heights.
He engaged in agricultural pursuits.
He served as member of the State assembly in 1828 and 1829.
Senior major general of the New York State Militia in 1824.
Commanded the military escort which accompanied General Lafayette in his progress through the State.
He moved to Huron County, Ohio, in 1837.

Brinkerhoff was elected as a Democrat to the Twenty-eighth Congress and served from March 4, 1843, until his death in Huron County, Ohio, April 30, 1844.
He was interred in the Pioneer Cemetery, Plymouth, Ohio.

See also
List of United States Congress members who died in office (1790–1899)

Sources

1787 births
1844 deaths
People from Huron County, Ohio
American militiamen in the War of 1812
American militia generals
Democratic Party members of the United States House of Representatives from Ohio
19th-century American politicians
People from Adams County, Pennsylvania
Military personnel from Pennsylvania